Margarita Xhepa (born 2 April 1932) is an Albanian actress, best known as one of the great ladies of Albanian cinema and theater. She continues to play in recent films such as Firdus in Bolero ne vilen e pleqve, based on the novel of the same title by Fatos Kongoli.

Early life 

Xhepa is an ethnic Aromanian. She was born in Lushnjë, Albania, as Margarita Prifti to Zoi and Marijë Prifti. Her mother died when Margarita was nine years old. From an early age, she loved Albanian poetry, and her teacher encouraged her to join acting classes. Gëzim Libohova, a well known drama teacher at the time at the cultural institute of Lushnjë, was scouting among local schools for an appropriate match for the role of a young Russian girl in a theatre play. As he saw Xhepa, he immediately chose her due to her blonde hair and blue eyes. The play was so successful it premiered also in Fier and Berat.

After finishing elementary school, she applied to the well known Liceu Artistik (School of Arts) in Tirana, in the drama department.

Career 
She began her career in Tirana, at the National Theatre. There she acted in plays by Anton Chekov, Friedrich Schiller, and Nikolai Gogol, among others. She has presented the first Festivali i Këngës in 1962.

She has been named a People's Artist of Albania.

International success 

The actress has been awarded the Actor Of Europe award in the 19th edition of the International Theater Festival. The main award for best acting went to one of the most important actresses in the wider space of Balkan theater, for the role of 'Lady Mother' in the play Who Brought Doruntina, directed by Laert Vasili.

Filmography 

 Unë Jam Lepuri – (1999)
 4 Nënat e Lepurit dhe Uznova '95 – (1995)
 E dashur Armike – (1993)
 E Zeza e Nënës – (1993)
 E shtuna e 11 Korrikut Xhiro – (1992)
 Gjyshja dhe Motra – (1992)
 Nositi – (1990)
 Uznova '89 (1989)
 Këngët Të Zemrës – (1987)
 Vrasje Në Gjueti – (1987)
 Rrethi i Kujtesës – (1987)
 Fjalë pa Fund – (1987)
 Dhe Vjen Një Ditë dhe Gabimi – (1986)
 Gurët e shtëpisë sime – (1985)
 Militanti – (1984)
 Apasionata – (1983)
 Dora e ngrohtë – (1983)
 Shokët – (1982)
 Dita e parë e emrimit – (1981)
 Me hapin e shokëve – (1979) (TV)
 Dollia e dasmës sime – (1978)
 Gjeneral gramafoni – (1978)
 Koncert në vitin 1936 (1978)
 Dimri i fundit – (1976)
 Pylli i lirisë – (1976)
 Tokë e përgjakur – (1976)
 Vitet e para – (1965)

References

External links 

Margarita Xhepa at Kinemaja Shqiptare (in Albanian)

1932 births
Living people
20th-century Albanian actresses
21st-century Albanian actresses
Albanian actresses
Albanian film actresses
Albanian stage actresses
People from Lushnjë
People's Artists of Albania
Merited Artists of Albania